Jagdish Narayan is an Indian-born American engineer. Since 2001, he has served as the John C. C. Fan Family Distinguished Chair Professor in the Materials Science and Engineering Department at North Carolina State University. He is also the distinguished visiting scientist at Oak Ridge National Laboratory. Narayan has published above 500 high-impact journal articles, with his discoveries covered in over 40 US and international patents.  His body of work can be segregated into highly nonequilibrium laser processing of novel nanomaterials, including Q-carbon, Q-BN, diamond and c-BN related materials. These research articles have received over 31,000 Google Citations with h-index >85. Narayan and his students discovered Q-carbon as the new allotrope, thereby finding a new route to fabricate diamond and related materials in ambient conditions, resulting in properties and applications ranging from high-temperature superconductivity in boron-doped Q-carbon to hardness than diamond in Q-carbon to enhanced field-emission in Q-carbon to nitrogen-doped nanodiamonds for quantum computing, nanosensing and solid-state devices.

Early life and education 
Jagdish Narayan came to the United States in 1969 from India. After completion of his bachelor's degree (with Distinction and Honors) from IIT Kanpur, India, he joined UC Berkeley in 1969 and finished his MS (1970) and PhD (1971) in materials science and engineering in two years. His doctoral thesis led to the publication of a dozen papers on defects and diffusion phenomena in archival journals.  His minors at Berkeley were physics, electrical and computer engineering. Narayan has continued his research at the interfaces of these disciplines of materials science, physics, electrical and computer engineering.

Professional career 
After finishing his PhD at the University of California, Berkeley, Narayan was appointed as research metallurgist at the Lawrence Berkeley National Laboratory from 1971 to 1972. He later moved to the Solid State Division at Oak Ridge National Laboratory, where he served as a senior scientist and group leader of the Thin Films and Electron Microscopy Group (1972–84). In 1984, he joined the North Carolina State University as NC Microelectronics Professor and director of the Microelectronics Center of North Carolina. His multi-faceted approach and contributions to research and teaching led to his appointment as a Distinguished University Professor in 1989. In 2001, he was appointed as the John C. Fan Distinguished Chair Professor. He also served as director of the Division of Materials Research (DMR) of US National Foundation (1990–92). Under his leadership, National Science Foundation launched a highly successful Presidential Initiative on Advanced Materials and Processing, which led to him receiving NSF's Distinguished Service Award. He has mentored over 80 PhDs, who are highly successful in the field of synthesis and processing of novel nanomaterials, atomic- and nanoscale materials characterization, structure-property correlations, modeling and devices.

Research 
With the discovery of nanosecond laser annealing, Narayan has pioneered developments in laser-solid interactions and transient thermal processing of nanomaterials and epitaxial thin films. With the development of pulsed laser deposition technique and domain matching epitaxy paradigm, he formed relaxed stoichiometric thin films on industrially relevant substrates across the misfit scale. These developments in materials fabrication technology resulted in fabrication of novel multifunctional materials like supersaturated semiconductor alloys, metal-ceramic nanocomposites, and laser-diffused solar cells.

While working on laser annealing of semiconductor alloys, Narayan touted it as the technique of choice for achieving temporal and spatial control on the dopant concentration in doped semiconductors. This technique resulted in the discovery of Q-carbon and Q-BN and conversion of amorphous carbon into diamond and h-BN into c-BN at ambient conditions are important in paving the pathway towards facile synthesis of diamond and cBN derivatives. The key aspect of this discovery is the generation of carbon melt in a super undercooled state (over 1000 K) below the normal melting point, followed with ultrafast quenching to form a new phase of carbon (named Q-carbon). On decreasing the undercooling, the formation of the relatively lower energy state i.e. diamond occurs. The subsequent work in materials processing and controlled laser annealing resulted in developments reported in: ACS Nano; ACS Applied Nano Materials; Applied Physics Letters; Journal of Applied Physics; Materials Research Letters; MRS Communications.

Research impact 
Narayan developed domain matching epitaxy (DME), which involves matching of integral multiples of lattice planes, addressing the epitaxial growth of heterostructures across the misfit scale. Domain matching epitaxy led to the integration of oxides and III-nitrides on industrially relevant (100) Si and sapphire substrates.

His research group at NC State focuses on the controlled fabrication and processing of novel nanomaterials utilizing the pulsed laser deposition using PLD and Laser MBE units, thermal processing of materials using nanosecond laser annealing and generating new epitaxial heterostructures across the misfit scale, utilizing domain matching epitaxy. The fabrication approach is complemented with the high-resolution scanning/transmission electron microscopy for analysis of defects and interfaces at atomic-scale to correlate the device performance with atomic structure. This approach of materials synthesis via non-equilibrium techniques and understanding the intricate structure-property correlations have led to the discovery of Q-carbon and Q-BN: the new densely-packed amorphous allotropes in carbon and boron nitride far from equilibrium. The doping of Boron in Q-carbon has resulted in polyamorphism and type-II high-temperature superconductivity in B-doped Q-carbon with superconducting transition temperature of 55 K

Using the DME epitaxial paradigm, the group integrated VO2 with Si for development of smart infrared sensors on a single computer chip. These research developments, especially in III-Nitrides were recognized by the American Institute of Physics for the Nobel Prize in Physics on blue light emitting diodes (LEDs) made from Gallium Nitride-based materials. One of the key research work was singled out by the American Institute of Physics with the focus on the development of GaN-based materials used in the Nobel Laureates’ work. His invention of Nano-Pocket LEDs is the key architecture utilized in the efficient Gallium Nitride-based light emitting diodes. In the late 1970s Narayan pioneered in solute trapping of dopants in semiconductor materials with his discoveries of nanosecond laser annealing. This extensive solute trapping above the retrograde solubility limits resulted in formation of supersaturated semiconductor alloys used in current integrated circuits. This discovery resulted in him receiving US Department of Energy award in 1981 and IR-100 award in 1983. In 2011, Acta Materialia bestowed the Gold Medal to Narayan for acting as a pioneer in solid state materials science and his leadership worldwide. The idea that solute trapping can be utilized to fabricate novel materials was introduced by John Cahn in the early 1970s, which resulted in the development of quasicrystals on Mn solute trapping in Al-Mn alloys and eventual 2011 Nobel prize award to Dan Schetman for his work on quasicrystals.

Honors and awards 
 National Academy of Engineering life member, Materials, 2017
 National Academy of Inventors Fellow, 2014
 North Carolina Science Award, 2014
 O. Max Gardner Award, 2014
 TMS RF Mehl Gold Medal, 2014
 Acta Materialia Gold Medal (Highest Honored from Worldwide Federation of Materials Societies), 2011
 RJ Reynolds Prize (Highest COE Honor), 2011
 Alexander Quarles Holladay Medal, 2012
 Lee Hsun Lecture Award from The Chinese Academy of Sciences, 2011
 Inaugural MRS Fellow, 2008
 Edward DeMille Campbell Lecture and Campbell Prize from ASM International, 2004
 TMS Life Fellow, 1999
 ASM Gold Medal, 1999 (Highest ASM International Honor)
 R&D-100 Award for Q-carbon and Diamond Related Products, 2017
 R&D-100 Award for New Materials Harder than Diamond and Superior High-Temp Superconductor, 2018
R&D-100 Award for Novel Nanodiamonds for Nano-sensing and Quantum Computing, 2019
 IR-100 Award for Laser Diffused Solar Cells, 1979
 IR-100 Award for Supersaturated Semiconductor Alloys, 1982
 IR-100 Award for Metal-Ceramic Nano-composites, 1983
 Department of Energy-Outstanding Research Award, 1979
 NSF Distinguished Service Award, 1992
 Fellow ASM-International
 Fellow of the American Physical Society, 1982 
Fellow of the American Academy of Arts and Sciences

References

External links 

 Oral history interview transcript with Jagdish Narayan on 17 March 2021, American Institute of Physics, Niels Bohr Library & Archives

Year of birth missing (living people)
Living people
North Carolina State University faculty
IIT Kanpur alumni
UC Berkeley College of Engineering alumni
20th-century Indian engineers
21st-century Indian engineers
Engineers from Uttar Pradesh
Lawrence Berkeley National Laboratory people
20th-century American engineers
21st-century American engineers
Oak Ridge National Laboratory people
Fellows of the American Physical Society
Fellows of the American Academy of Arts and Sciences
Members of the United States National Academy of Engineering
Indian emigrants to the United States
Fellows of the Minerals, Metals & Materials Society